Archips socotranus is a species of moth of the family Tortricidae. It is found in Socotra, Yemen.

References

Moths described in 1900
Archips
Endemic fauna of Socotra
Moths of Asia